Lightning Bolt is a noise rock duo from Providence, Rhode Island, composed of Brian Chippendale on drums and vocals and Brian Gibson on bass guitar.  The group's discography consists of seven full-length studio albums and a number of 7-inch singles and splits.  Lightning Bolt have also appeared on numerous compilations, starred in the 2003 tour-DVD The Power of Salad, and performed in DVD compilations such as Pick a Winner (Load Records, 2004) and Sleep When You are Dead by performance artists Mighty Robot (Contact Records, 2007).

Albums

Extended plays

7-inch records

Collaborative extended plays

Singles

DVD / video
{|class="wikitable"
! width="33"| Year
! width="250"| Video details
|-
| align="center"| 2003
| The Power of Salad
 Label: Load Records (Load #40)
 Directed by Peter Glantz and Nick Noe
|-
|}

Appearances on compilations
{| class="wikitable"
!align="left width="33"|Year
!align="left width="250"|Title
!align="left width="180"|Track(s)
!align="left width="120"|Label
!align="left width="160"|Other
|-
| 1996
| Repopulation Program
| "Revenge"
|Load Records
|
 Only official release with Hisham Bharoocha.
|-
|rowspan="2"|1999
| Fruited Other Surfaces
| "LB.3.K6K3GU3.GO"
| Vermiform Records
|
|-
| You're Soaking in It
| "Diet of Grapes and Nuts"
| Load Records
|
|-
|rowspan="2"|2000
| Bad Music for Bad People
| "Rotata-ville"
| Trash Art!
|
|-
| Mish Mash Mush Mega Mix Vol. 3
| "Race Back to Earth"
| Fort Thunder
|
|-
|rowspan="6"|2001
| U.S. Pop Life Vol. 7: Random AccessMusic Machine
| "Untitled"
| Contact Records
|
|-
| KFJC Live from the Devil's Triangle Vol. III
| "Untitled"
| KFJC
|
|-
| Real Slow Radio
| "Jam at the Parlor"
| Fort Thunder
|
|-
| Old Tyme Lemonade
| "Swarm"
| Hospital Productions
|
 Chippendale side-project Mindflayer also appears.
|-
| Troubleman Mix-Tape
| "Waiting for the Snake Assassin"
| Troubleman Unlimited Records
|
|-
| Mish Mash Mush Vol. 7
| "Luxery Tomb"
| Fort Thunder
|
|-
|rowspan="3"|2002
| Don't Shoot the Toy Piano Player
| "13 Monsters"
| WFMU
|-
| If The Twenty-First Century Didn't Exist,It Would Be Necessary To Invent It
| "Ride The Friendly Skies"
| 5RC
|
|-
|U.S. Pop Life Vol. 12: Random Slice ofLife at Ft. Thunder – Bands Who Played At
| "Untitled"
| Contact Records
|
|-
|rospawn="1"|2004
| Pick a Winner (DVD and CD)
| Live performance
| Load Records
|
|-
|rowspan="2"|2005
| I Love Guitar Wolf...Very Much
| "Planet of the Wolves"
| Narnack Records
|
|-
| A Benefit For Our Friends(DMBQ Tribute CD)
| "Excitebike"
| none
|
|-
|rospawn="1"|2006
| Rough Trade Shops: Rock and Roll 1
| "Riffwraiths"
| V2 Records
|
|-
|rowspan="4"|2007
| Ex Drummer
| "2 Morro Morro Land"
| Play It Again Sam
|
|-
| The Supermassive Selection CD by Muse
| "Magic Mountain"
| New Musical Express
|
 CD accompanying NME Magazine, June 16, 2007.
|-
| Sleep When You are Deadby Mighty Robot (DVD)
| Live performance
| Contact Records
|
|-
| Cue the Bugle Turbulent(The 2007 Believer Music Issue CD)
| "Deceiver"
|The Believer
|}<div align="left">

Music videos

See also
 Load Records discography

References

General
 
Specific

External links
 
 Discography on Load Records
 Discography on Bowdoin.edu

Lightning Bolt
Rock music group discographies